SM U-74 was a Type UE 1 submarine and one of the 329 submarines serving in the Imperial German Navy in World War I.
U-74 was engaged in the naval warfare and took part in the First Battle of the Atlantic.

Design
German Type UE I submarines were preceded by the longer Type U 66 submarines. U-74 had a displacement of  when at the surface and  while submerged. The submarine was powered by two  engines for use while surfaced, and two  engines for use while submerged. She had two propeller shafts.

U-74 was fitted with two  torpedo tubes (one at the port bow and one starboard stern), four torpedoes, and one  SK L/30 deck gun. She had a complement of thirty-two (twenty-eight crew members and four officers).

Summary of raiding history

References

Notes

Citations

Bibliography

World War I submarines of Germany
1915 ships
Maritime incidents in 1916
U-boats sunk in 1916
U-boats sunk by mines
U-boats commissioned in 1915
Ships built in Kiel
German Type UE I submarines
World War I shipwrecks in the North Sea
Ships lost with all hands